The 1992 Calder Cup playoffs of the American Hockey League began on April 7, 1992. The twelve teams that qualified, four from each division, played best-of-seven series for division semifinals and division finals. The highest remaining seed received a bye for the third round while the other two remaining teams played a best-of-three series, with the winner advancing to play the bye-team in a best-of-seven series for the Calder Cup. The Calder Cup Final ended on May 29, 1992, with the Adirondack Red Wings defeating the St. John's Maple Leafs four games to three in a series in which the visiting team won every game to win the fourth Calder Cup in team history. Adirondack's Allan Bester won the Jack A. Butterfield Trophy as AHL playoff MVP.

Playoff seeds
After the 1991-92 AHL regular season, twelve teams qualified for the playoffs. The top four teams from each division qualified for the playoffs. The Fredericton Canadiens finished the regular season with the best overall record.

Atlantic Division
Fredericton Canadiens - 96 points
St. John's Maple Leafs - 90 points
Cape Breton Oilers - 82 points
Moncton Hawks - 74 points

Northern Division
Springfield Indians - 94 points
Adirondack Red Wings - 84 points
New Haven Nighthawks - 82 points
Capital District Islanders - 75 points

Southern Division
Binghamton Rangers - 91 points
Rochester Americans - 86 points
Hershey Bears - 83 points
Utica Devils - 74 points

Bracket

In each round the team that earned more points during the regular season receives home ice advantage, meaning they receive the "extra" game on home-ice if the series reaches the maximum number of games. For the Semifinal round, the team that earned the most points during the regular season out of the three remaining teams receives a bye directly to the Calder Cup Final. There is no set series format due to arena scheduling conflicts and travel considerations.

Division Semifinals 
Note 1: Home team is listed first.
Note 2: The number of overtime periods played (where applicable) is not specified

Atlantic Division

(A1) Fredericton Canadiens vs. (A4) Moncton Hawks

(A2) St. John's Maple Leafs vs. (A3) Cape Breton Oilers

Northern Division

(N1) Springfield Indians vs. (N4) Capital District Islanders

(N2) Adirondack Red Wings vs. (N3) New Haven Nighthawks

Southern Division

(S1) Binghamton Rangers vs. (S4) Utica Devils

(S2) Rochester Americans vs. (S3) Hershey Bears

Division Finals

Atlantic Division

(A2) St. John's Maple Leafs vs. (A4) Moncton Hawks

Northern Division

(N1) Springfield Indians vs. (N2) Adirondack Red Wings

Minor league star Bruce Boudreau played his final game in this series, appearing for Adirondack as an emergency injury replacement in the third and fourth matches.

Southern Division

(S1) Binghamton Rangers vs. (S2) Rochester Americans

Semifinal

Bye
(A2) St. John's Maple Leafs receive a bye to the Calder Cup Final by virtue of having earned the highest point total in the regular season out of the three remaining teams.

(S2) Rochester Americans vs. (N2) Adirondack Red Wings

Calder Cup Final

(A2) St. John's Maple Leafs vs. (N2) Adirondack Red Wings

See also
1991–92 AHL season
List of AHL seasons

References

Calder Cup
Calder Cup playoffs